Sandra Echeverría Gamboa (born December 11, 1984) is a Mexican actress and singer.

Life and career

In 2002, Echeverría starred in TV Azteca's Súbete A Mi Moto, alongside Bárbara Mori and Michel Brown. In 2004, she led the second season of TV Azteca's Soñarás. In 2006, she starred in Telemundo's Marina, opposite Mauricio Ochmann. Her co-protagonist was eventually replaced by Manolo Cardona.

In 2008, she played the girlfriend of High School Musical Star Corbin Bleu in Free Style. She also starred in El Diez with Alfonso Herrera. The movie, whose story revolves around football, premiered in 2010, to coincide with the World Cup in South Africa. She reunited with Mauricio Ochmann in El Clon, a joint venture of Rede Globo and Telemundo.

In 2010, she had the lead in a science fiction movie in Mexico, called 2033. In 2011, she starred in Televisa's La fuerza del destino with David Zepeda, although she is still under Telemundo. In 2011 she starred in El cartel de los sapos as ELiana, together with Manolo Cardona, Pedro Armendáriz Jr. and Saúl Lisazo.

In 2012, she starred in Relaciones Peligrosas under Telemundo Studios, with Gabriel Coronel. In 2012 she starred in Matt Piedmont's comedy Casa de Mi Padre as Miguel Ernesto's wife (in the flashback). The telenovela La Traicion (2008) was originally announced with Mario Cimarro, Sandra Echeverría and Gabriel Porras as stars. Danna Garcia replaced Echeverría and Salvador del Solar replaced Porras, who took the male lead in Madre Luna. In 2012, Echeverría starred in an Oliver Stone Movie, Savages as Magda, Elena's daughter which was played by Salma Hayek.

In 2013, Echeverría played the character Eva Guerra in the FX television drama The Bridge, the estranged girlfriend of a narco-trafficker and killer who is seeking her, but who is helped by character Steven Linder.

The last few years She has done several films and tv series like
“Cambio de Ruta”, “Amor de mis Amores”, “Busco Novio para mi mujer”, “Más Sabe el Diablo por Viejo”, “Las Píldoras de mi Novio” and She broke records of rating with “La Usurpadora”.

She also did “La Querida del Centauro” and starred in “La Bandida”.

She released the album “Instinto” in 2019. She is now preparing a new Mariachi album.

Filmography

Film roles

Television roles

Discography

Soundtrack

As featured artist

Awards and nominations

 People En Español named Sandra as "One of the 50 most beautiful people" in 2012.

References

External links 

 

Living people
Mexican film actresses
Mexican stage actresses
Mexican telenovela actresses
Mexican television actresses
Mexican expatriates in the United States
21st-century Mexican actresses
21st-century Mexican singers
21st-century Mexican women singers
1984 births